The Maserati 8CLT is an open-wheel race car, designed, developed and built by Italian manufacturer Maserati in 1950, conforming to Formula One rules and regulations of the time, set by the FIA.

Two copies were produced, on behalf of the Italian drivers Nino Farina and Franco Rol, to participate in the 1950 Indianapolis 500, it never started the American race and was then sold in New Zealand.

Racing and competitive history
The car was designed and built to take part in the Indianapolis 500. It replaced the obsolete 8CTF, which however still achieved important results.

The mechanics were inspired by that of the 8CL but were perfected using more modern metallurgical treatments and using more appropriate construction techniques.

The great power of the engine led Maserati to strengthen the chassis to obviate the greater stresses. The latter was derived from that of the 4CLT/48. Aerodynamics were also improved, and the model also featured 400mm front drums which were state-of-the-art for the time.

The Maserati, however, was not going through a good moment, and the development of the model was postponed. The subsequent launch at the Indianapolis 500, therefore, did not take place. Two examples were built, which were sold to Scuderia Zambucka, a New Zealand team.

Design

The ignition was single with a Marelli brand magnet. The feeding was forced with two Roots brand compressors, and a carburetor produced by Weber model 52 DCO, positioned upstream of the compressors themselves. Distribution was ensured by four valves per cylinder arranged in a 90° V, and a double overhead camshaft. Lubrication was forced with delivery and recovery pumps. The cooling system was water circulation with a centrifugal pump.

Both bore and stroke were 78mm. The power output was 430 hp at 6500 rpm.

The brakes were drum brakes on the wheels with hydraulic control. The front suspensions consisted of coil springs, while the rear ones consisted of leaf springs. Both were fitted with Houdaille hydraulic shock absorbers. The steering was a worm screw and toothed sector, while the transmission consisted of a four-speed gearbox plus reverse.

The body was an open-wheel design, covered in aluminum, while the chassis was tubular with side members and cross members.<ref>

References

8CLT
Grand Prix cars